Bupyeon is a type of steamed tteok (rice cake), used in traditional weddings. It is a local specialty of Miryang, South Gyeongsang Province.

Preparation 
Glutinous rice flour is kneaded with boiling water and rolled into small round cakes with fillings made of toasted soybean powder, cinnamon powder, and honey. The cakes are then coated with white gomul (dressing powder) made with geopi-pat (husked adzuki beans, often the black variety), garnished with thin strips of jujube or gotgam (dried persimmon), and steamed in siru (steamer).

See also 
 Danja
 Gyeongdan

References 

Glutinous rice dishes
Stuffed dishes
Tteok